Jacob-Magnus (Jacob) Söderman (born 19 March 1938 in Helsinki, Finland) is a Finnish politician who served as Finnish Member of Parliament in 1972–1982 and again in 2007–2011. Söderman is a member of the Social Democratic Party of Finland and served as Minister of Justice (In October 1971), Minister of Social Affairs and Health (1982), governor of Uusimaa Province (1982–89), Parliamentary Ombudsman of Finland (1989–95) and the first European Ombudsman (1995–2003). Söderman returned to the Parliament in Autumn 2007 when MP Tuula Haatainen resigned in order to become a deputy city manager of Helsinki.

Söderman was the president of the Council for Mass Media in Finland in 2003–2005, a member of the board of the University of Helsinki 2004–2006 and member of the Group of Wise Persons 2005–2006.

Honours
 Grand Cross of Bernardo O'Higgins Decoration conferred by Chile 1993
 Grand Cross of the Lions Decoration of Finland 1995
 European Information Association Award for Achievement in European Information 1996
 Honorary Doctorate of Political Sciences, Åbo Academy, Finland 1998
 Honorary Doctorate in Law, University of Lapland 1999
 Special Award for the European Ombudsman's Contribution to Dissemination of Information by the Ministry of Education of Finland 2000
 Alexis de Tocqueville Prize, European Institute of Public Administration (EIPA) 2001
 Knight of the French Legion of Honour 2002
 Snellman Prize, Finnish Periodical Publishers Association 2002
 Expatriate of the Year Award 2003
 Consumer of the Year Award, The Finnish Consumers' Association  2005
 Codex medaljen 2006
 Chydenius Prize 2006
 Finnish Humanist Union Prize 2007
 Nordic Administrative Union/Finnish association Prize 2007

References 

1938 births
Living people
Politicians from Helsinki
Swedish-speaking Finns
Social Democratic Party of Finland politicians
Ministers of Justice of Finland
Ministers of Social Affairs of Finland
Members of the Parliament of Finland (1972–75)
Members of the Parliament of Finland (1975–79)
Members of the Parliament of Finland (1979–83)
Members of the Parliament of Finland (2007–11)
Ombudsmen in the European Union
Chevaliers of the Légion d'honneur